The 2014 Copa Metropolitana (also known as the 2014 Copa Nestor Ludwig in this edition, in posthumous tribute) was the 2nd season of the Copa Metropolitana, a domestic cup in Rio Grande do Sul football, which is a knockout cup competition. The tournament began on 2 August and ended on 16 November with the final second leg.

In this year, seven clubs of the metropolitan region of the state decided to participate in the Copa Metropolitana, which varies in number of participants according to the interest of clubs in the first, second and third divisions of the Campeonato Gaúcho. This time, one of the two greatest clubs in the state, the Grêmio, will compete in the Copa Sul-Fronteira, to not let unequal with two big clubs in the same competition.

Novo Hamburgo enters in the 2014 Copa Metropolitana defending his title won in 2013, being the first champion in history.

Format
In the first stage, all teams face off in round-robin, which will qualify the top four for the next phase, known as the semi-finals. At this stage, the first placed facing the fourth place and second place playing against the third placed in two matches each. The winners face off in the final two matches to define the winner of the competition.

The 2014 Copa Metropolitana winners qualify for the 2014 Super Copa Gaúcha, where it will have the opportunity to qualify for 2015 Campeonato Brasileiro Série D. The winner of the Super Copa Gaúcha also dispute the 2015 Recopa Gaúcha, against the winner of 2014 Campeonato Gaúcho at the beginning of next season.

Clubs
This year, the FGF decided to change one of the two big clubs of the state to another region, the Grêmio was randomly chosen. Thus, it was moved to compete Copa Sul-Fronteira. Theoretically this makes less unequal competition. The following 7 clubs compete in the Copa Metropolitana during the 2014 edition.

First round

Standings

Matches

Records and statistics

Goalscorers
This is the complete list of goalscorers in the competition.

References

External links
FGF website. Federação Gaúcha de Futebol.

Football competitions in Rio Grande do Sul
State football cup competitions in Brazil
2014 domestic association football cups